Garberville is a census-designated place in Humboldt County, California. The population was 913 at the 2010 United States Census. Garberville is the primary town in the area known as the Mateel Region, consisting of parts of the Mattole and Eel River watersheds in southern Humboldt and northern Mendocino counties.

History
Prior to recorded history, the area was populated by southern Sinkyone people.

In 1853, a Spanish explorer, Antone Garcia, settled in the area near Town Gulch, which runs through modern-day Garberville. The first post office in Garberville opened in 1874. Jacob C. Garber, the town postmaster, later named the town after himself in 1879.

Geography

Climate
The Köppen Climate Classification subtype for this climate is Csb (Mediterranean climate), characterized by cold, rainy winters and hot, dry summers.

Demographics

The 2010 United States Census reported that Garberville had a population of 913. The racial makeup of Garberville was 815 (89.3%) White, 14 (1.5%) African American, 29 (3.2%) Native American, 17 (1.9%) Asian, 0 (0.0%) Pacific Islander, 7 (0.8%) from other races, and 31 (3.4%) from two or more races. Hispanic or Latino of any race were 54 persons (5.9%).

The Census reported that 785 people (86.0% of the population) lived in households, 128 (14.0%) lived in non-institutionalized group quarters, and 0 (0%) were institutionalized.

There were 390 households, out of which 86 (22.1%) had children under the age of 18 living in them, 102 (26.2%) were opposite-sex married couples living together, 47 (12.1%) had a female householder with no husband present, 33 (8.5%) had a male householder with no wife present.  There were 50 (12.8%) unmarried opposite-sex partnerships, and 5 (1.3%) same-sex married couples or partnerships. 172 households (44.1%) were made up of individuals, and 49 (12.6%) had someone living alone who was 65 years of age or older. The average household size was 2.01.  There were 182 families (46.7% of all households); the average family size was 2.69.

The population was spread out, with 160 people (17.5%) under the age of 18, 85 people (9.3%) aged 18 to 24, 258 people (28.3%) aged 25 to 44, 285 people (31.2%) aged 45 to 64, and 125 people (13.7%) who were 65 years of age or older.  The median age was 40.0 years. For every 100 females, there were 109.9 males.  For every 100 females age 18 and over, there were 105.2 males.

The homeowner vacancy rate was 2.2%; the rental vacancy rate was 2.3%.  388 people (42.5% of the population) lived in owner-occupied housing units and 397 people (43.5%) lived in rental housing units.

Economy 
Marijuana cultivation has replaced timber as the economic driver of Garberville and neighboring Redway.  There is a Cannabis College in Garberville, and the town has been called "the marijuana heartland of the U.S." by BBC News.

Reggae on the River, an annual music festival, is held near Garberville. Nearby, the 1925 Tudor Revival Benbow Inn is on the National Register of Historic Places.

Government

Politics

Incorporation attempts
A proposal to incorporate Garberville as a city was dropped after county supervisors declined to form a Municipal Advisory Committee due to concerns over the associated costs.  A group of local residents once attempted to qualify a "Sequoia County" initiative to secede from both Humboldt and Mendocino County with Garberville as the new county seat, although the campaign ended without gathering enough signatures.  A local chapter of the Green Party was formed in 2006.

Education
The district has five elementary, one middle school, one high school and one learning center. 
 Redway School 
 Whitethorn School 
 Agnes Johnson School 
 Casterlin School 
 Ettersburg School 
 Miranda Junior High School
 South Fork High School 
 Osprey Learning Center

Media
Garberville is home to both weekly newspapers in the Mateel Region, the locally owned Independent and Redwood Times, run by Media News Group as a sister publication of the daily Times-Standard from Eureka.   Redwood Community Radio, KMUD, broadcasts from Garberville at 91.1 FM.

Infrastructure

Transportation
U.S. Route 101 bypasses the town, with exits 639 and 642 at Garberville and Redway, respectively.

Humboldt Transit Authority serves from Garberville as far north as Trinidad.

Garberville is served by Amtrak Thruway Motorcoach for out of region public transportation.

Utilities
Garberville's ZIP Code is 95542. The community is inside area code 707.

The Garberville Fire Protection District, has three engines and a utility truck, self-contained breathing apparatuses and radios. The Garberville Water Company supplies drinking water to residents and maintains 27 fire hydrants on its water lines.  The Garberville Sanitary District is not the same as the water company, but provides sewers in the core of the fire district.  Some releases of water have contained one or more toxins.

Health care
The Jerold Phelps Community Hospital is administered by the Southern Humboldt Community Healthcare District.

Notable residents

Major League Baseball player Marshall Brant was born in Garberville.

See also
 
 Avenue of the Giants
 Eel River Athapaskan traditional narratives
 Emerald City, California

References

External links
 https://www.elevatethemagic.com
 Garberville-Redway Area Chamber of Commerce
 Garberville Theatre, history and photographs

Further reading
 Schneider, Keith Garberville Journal; Marijuana Once Reigned as the King, New York Times, January 26, 1988

Census-designated places in Humboldt County, California
Cannabis culture
Census-designated places in California
1862 establishments in California